Tschermakfjellet is a mountain in Dickson Land at Spitsbergen, Svalbard. It has a height of 422 m.a.s.l., and is located between the valley of Sauriedalen and Kongressfjellet. The mountain is named after Austrian mineralogist Gustav Tschermak von Seysenegg.

Geology
The mountain has given name to the Triassic Tschermakfjellet Formation of the Kapp Toscana Group, consisting of sandstones and silty shales.

References

Mountains of Spitsbergen